Voleo is a Canadian-based financial services company, headquartered in Vancouver, BC. Voleo is transforming retail investing through its collaborative investment club platform. Voleo enables users to form investment clubs with people they trust to democratically manage a portfolio in publicly traded securities. Voleo has increased retail investor participation in the stock market by breaking down barriers to entry, facilitating trust and improving financial literacy.

Voleo is a publicly held company, trading on the TSX Venture Exchange under the ticker TRAD (TSX:V TRAD).

Voleo USA Inc. was a FINRA-registered broker-dealer registered with the U.S. Securities and Exchange Commission, and former member of the Securities Investor Protection Corporation (SIPC).

History
Voleo was founded in 2013 in Vancouver, BC. In October 2015, Voleo launched a simulated university trading competition in collaboration with Toronto Stock Exchange (TSX) and TSX Venture Exchange (TSXV), with the results announced in 2016. Over two thousand students participated in this inaugural event. Voleo was part of Accenture's FinTech Innovation Lab London 2016. In the ensuing months, Voleo prepared its apps for live trading and commenced the registration of subsidiary Voleo USA.

In March 2017, Voleo announced the completion of US State registrations for its subsidiary Voleo USA. Voleo won Best of Show for its white-label platform at Finovate Fall 2017 in New York, and was selected for PlugAndPlay's Fintech Accelerator. In December 2017, Voleo along with Nasdaq completed an inaugural equity trading competition, and the winning team was joined by host representatives for a tour of Nasdaq's Market Site in Times Square in February 2018. In December 2018, OP Financial Group announced it would be piloting the white-label Voleo platform in Europe as part of the OP WealthTech Partnership Program.

In 2019, Voleo held its second equity trading competition in partnership with Nasdaq to promote financial literacy and awareness amongst college students. In May 2019 Voleo was selected to participate in the FIS Fintech Accelerator program at the Venture Center. In June 2019 Voleo joined Google's Digital Strategy Program to scale and accelerate user acquisition and growth.

Products
The Voleo stock trading app for investment clubs is available in the United States through the Google Play Store and Apple App Store. The Voleo app allows users to create clubs with 3-100 people, propose, discuss, and vote on trades. All customer accounts and assets are held by APEX Clearing Corporation, who are the fully disclosed carrying broker of introducing broker Voleo USA, Inc.

Voleo SimuTrader is a free investment club simulator available internationally through the Google Play Store and Apple App Store. The Voleo SimuTrader allows users to form investment clubs, propose trades, discuss and vote, track performance, and manage decisions in an entirely simulated environment.

Both Voleo apps track decisions made by club members and assigns a score to each member, known as a Definitive Return on Investment Decisions (DROID) score. This enables users to learn while feeding a community where top performing individuals as well as clubs can be followed in real time for investment ideas.  These ideas can then be vetted with their trusted peers.

Awards

 Best in Show at Finovate Fall 2017 
 Fintech Breakthrough Awards for Best Stock Trading App in 2019.

References

External links 
 Official website

Financial markets
Financial services companies based in British Columbia
Financial technology companies
Financial services companies of the United States
Online brokerages
Companies based in Vancouver
Financial technology
Financial services companies established in 2013
Canadian companies established in 2013